St Mary's Church or the Church of the Immaculate Conception is a Roman Catholic Parish church in Headland, Hartlepool, County Durham, England. It was built in 1850 and designed by Joseph Hansom in the Gothic Revival style. It is located on Durham Street, behind Hartlepool Borough Hall. It was first Catholic church to be built in Hartlepool since the Reformation and it is a Grade II listed building.

History

Foundation
In 1834, a Catholic mission was started to serve the local Catholic population of Hartlepool. That year, a chapel was built. It was constructed by a Mr John Wells on the corner of Prissick Street and Henry Street. The priest at the chapel was a Fr William Knight who had come from Ushaw College. In 1837 a school was also built.

Construction
Between 1840 and 1850, the population of Hartlepool doubled and a new, larger church needed to built to accommodate the growing Catholic population. Funds were raised by Fr Knight and a Mr Lawrenson. The funds were collected and building work started in 1850. On 28 August 1851, the church was opened by William Hogarth, the Bishop of Hexham. It replaced St Mary's Chapel and is dedicated to the Immaculate Conception of Mary. It was designed by Joseph Hansom, who also designed Birmingham Town Hall and Arundel Cathedral and it was built by John Galley and the total cost was £4000. It was largely paid for by subscriptions. In 1884, St Bega's School was built. From St Mary's, other missions were started in Hartlepool from which other churches were built such as St Joseph's Church. In 1946, the spire of the church was demolished, because it was in poor condition.

Parish
With St Joseph's Church in Hartlepool, and St Patrick's Church, St Cuthbert's Church, St John Vianney's Church, the church is part of the Holy Family Parish. St Mary's Church has one Sunday Mass at 11:00am.

See also
 St Joseph's Church, Hartlepool

References

External links
 
 

Buildings and structures in Hartlepool
Roman Catholic churches completed in 1851
Grade II listed churches in County Durham
Roman Catholic churches in County Durham
Grade II listed Roman Catholic churches in England
Gothic Revival church buildings in England
Gothic Revival architecture in County Durham
1851 establishments in England
19th-century Roman Catholic church buildings in the United Kingdom
Buildings by Joseph Hansom